George Krstic (born 1972) is an American director, screenwriter and producer known for his work in the science fiction, comic book and animation genres. Story editor on the Emmy-Nominated Downtown and Co-Creator of Megas XLR, Krstic recently served as a writer on George Lucas' television series Star Wars: The Clone Wars as well as the scrapped  Gonzo production of Gonin - The Five Killers, along with Kingdom Come scribe Mark Waid and Afro Samurai producer Eric Calderon.

Awards
Grand Prize, Golden Eagle - CINE Film Festival
Eagle - CINE Film Festival
First Place - Moomba International Film Festival
Silver Seal - Manchester International Film Festival
Three Stars - Canadian International Annual Film & Video Festival
Finalist - Worldfest Charleston International Film Festival
Finalist - New York International Non-Broadcast Festival
Special Mention - Cork International Youth Film & Video Festival
Special Mention - BRNO-16 International Film Festival
Honorable Mention - American International Film & Video Festival
Honorable Mention - Ebensee International Film Festival
Honorable Mention - International Juvenale Festival

Nominations
Primetime Emmy Award for MTV Downtown (2000)
 Saturn Award for Star Wars: The Clone Wars (2009)
Annie Award for Motorcity (2012)
Annie Award for Motorcity (2013)

Filmography

Director
 The Last Actor (1994)
 Lowbrow (2003)
 Megas XLR (2004)
 Dark Vault (in development)

Producer
 The Last Actor (1994)
 Lowbrow (2003)
 Megas XLR (2004-2005)
 Orion (in development)
 Dark Vault (in development)
 Gonin - The Five Killers (in development)

Writer
 The Last Actor (1994)
 MTV Downtown (1999): story editor
 Lowbrow (2003)
Megas XLR (2004-2005): story editor
 Star Wars: The Clone Wars (2008-2009)
 Cartoon Network Universe: FusionFall (2009 video game)
 League of Legends (2009 video game)
 Motorcity (2012-2013)
 Max Steel (2013)
 Transformers: Combiner Wars (2016)
 Transformers: War for Cybertron Trilogy (2020)
 Orion (in development)
 Dark Vault (in development)
 Gonin - The Five Killers (in development): story editor
 Versus (a.k.a. "Versus 2," "The American Versus") (in development)

Bibliography

Writer

 Axcess Magazine (Axcess Publishing, 1995–1997)
 Jam Packed Action #1 (DC Comics, 2005)
 Action Pack #1 (DC Comics, July 2006)
 Action Pack #4 (DC Comics, October 2006)
 Action Pack #5 (DC Comics, November 2006)
 Action Pack #9 (DC Comics, March 2007)
 Action Pack #11 (DC Comics, May 2007)
Cartoon Network Universe: FusionFall Worlds Collide (CN Comics, July 2007)

Editor
 Axcess Magazine (Axcess Publishing, 1995–1997)

References

George Krstic's Comic Book Titles on Atomic Avenue

External links
George K's Blog
George Krstic's website

Five Killers Online Trailer

American male screenwriters
American film producers
Living people
1972 births